The 2003 Asian Youth Boys Volleyball Championship was held in Rajiv Gandhi Indoor Stadium, Visakhapatnam, India from 6 to 13 April 2003.

Pools composition
The teams are seeded based on their final ranking at the 2001 Asian Youth Boys Volleyball Championship.

* Withdrew

Preliminary round

Pool A

|}

|}

Pool B

|}

|}

Final round

Quarterfinals

|}

5th–8th semifinals

|}

Semifinals

|}

7th place

|}

5th place

|}

3rd place

|}

Final

|}

Final standing

Awards
MVP:  Sanjay Kumar
Best Scorer:  Mohammad Soleimani
Best Spiker:  Pak Yong-nam
Best Blocker:  Sanjay Kumar
Best Server:  Arash Sadeghiani
Best Setter:  Ramaswami Kamraj
Best Digger:  Moslem Mohammadizadeh
Best Receiver:  P. S. Srikanth
Special Award:  Zane Christensen

References
 www.jva.or.jp

External links
FIVB

A
V
V
Asian Boys' U18 Volleyball Championship